Bangka Strait is the strait that separates the island of Sumatra from Bangka Island in the Java Sea, Indonesia.

See also
 Japanese cruiser Ashigara
 List of straits

References

Straits of Indonesia
Landforms of Sumatra
Java Sea